Bogić Bogićević (18 April 1955 – 30 January 2017) was a Serbian football manager and player.

Career
During his footballing career as a goalkeeper, Bogićević played for his hometown club Borac Čačak during the 1970s, as well as for Zemun during the 1980s, making eight appearances in the Yugoslav First League in the 1982–83 season. He later also played for Dinamo Pančevo and Bežanija.

After hanging up his boots, Bogićević started his managerial career as an assistant to Đorđe Gerum. He later served as manager of numerous clubs in his homeland, including Donji Srem and Javor Ivanjica in the Serbian SuperLiga. Subsequently, Bogićević led Borac Čačak (2013–14) and Napredak Kruševac (2015–16) to promotion to the top flight.

Honours
Napredak Kruševac
 Serbian First League: 2015–16

References

External links
 
 

Association football goalkeepers
FK Bežanija players
FK Borac Čačak managers
FK Borac Čačak players
FK Dinamo Pančevo players
FK Javor Ivanjica managers
FK Napredak Kruševac managers
FK Zemun managers
FK Zemun players
Serbian football managers
Serbian footballers
Serbian SuperLiga managers
Sportspeople from Čačak
Yugoslav First League players
Yugoslav footballers
1955 births
2017 deaths